Richard Martin (born 1789 and christened 29 November 1789 at Lancing, Sussex; details of death unknown) was an English cricketer who played in three first-class matches from 1815 to 1816.  He was a wicket-keeper mainly associated with Sussex.

References

External links
 CricketArchive profile

1789 births
English cricketers
English cricketers of 1787 to 1825
Sussex cricketers
Year of death unknown
People from Lancing, West Sussex